The Campaign Against Genocide Museum is one of the eight museums managed by the the Rwanda Cultural Heritage Academy (RCHA). It is housed in the Parliamentary building of Rwanda (the former Conseil National de Development) and was inaugurated in 2017 by Paul Kagame with an aim to showcase the history of Rwanda during the campaign against the genocide against the Tutsi.

Background 
The parliament building was chosen as the location for this museum because it housed 600 Rwanda Patriotic Army soldiers from December 1993 to 1994 as they were preparing for the formation of the Broad-Based Transitional Government and the National Transitional Assembly. Paul Kagame, the RPA Chairman of High Command, later, during the genocide against the Tutsi in Rwanda, ordered that the soldiers break out of their confinement to save thousands of Tutsi who were being killed.

The museum opened on 4 July 2014.

Flaunts 
The main flaunt of the Campaign Against Genocide Museum is the campaign against the genocide, how it was planned and executed by the Rwanda Patriotic Army regardless of the withdrawal of the United Nation troops from Rwanda during the genocide. The museum also highlights how the 600 hundred RPA soldiers rescued victims. One of its popular monuments is a machine gun that was used by RPA armies residing in the parliament building to mitigate genocidal forces.

References

External links 
 

Museums in Rwanda
Genocide museums
2017 establishments in Rwanda